Marian McGennis (born November 1953) is a former Irish Fianna Fáil politician.

A former civil servant, McGennis unsuccessfully contested the Dublin North constituency at the 1992 general election, and was then nominated to the 20th Seanad by Taoiseach Albert Reynolds, where she served from 1993 to 1997.

She first elected to Dáil Éireann as a Fianna Fáil Teachta Dála (TD) for the Dublin Central constituency at the 1997 general election. The constituency boundaries were changed before the 2002 general election and she instead contested the Dublin South-Central constituency which had gained an extra seat. However, she was not re-elected.

McGennnis was a member of Dublin County Council from 1985 to 1991, and of Fingal County Council from 1993 to 1998. She was elected to Dublin City Council 1999 as a councillor for Ballyfermot, but was defeated at the 2004 local elections.

She was educated at St Patrick's College, Maynooth.

References

1953 births
Living people
Alumni of St Patrick's College, Maynooth
Councillors of Dublin County Council
Fianna Fáil TDs
Fianna Fáil senators
Local councillors in Dublin (city)
Local councillors in Fingal
Members of the 20th Seanad
20th-century women members of Seanad Éireann
Members of the 28th Dáil
20th-century women Teachtaí Dála
21st-century women Teachtaí Dála
Nominated members of Seanad Éireann